Tonkinson is a surname. Notable people with the surname include:

Albert Tonkinson (born 1936), English rugby league player
Paul Tonkinson (born 1969), English comedian, radio presenter, and television personality

See also
Tomkinson